The following television stations broadcast on digital channel 7 in Mexico:

 XHFGL-TDT in Durango, Durango
 XHTUG-TDT in Tuxtla Gutiérrez, Chiapas

07